Katip Sumat uprising was a revolt in 19th century Southern Vietnam. It was led by Cham Muslim leader Katip Sumat. This is the only ever-recorded jihad war involving Vietnam.

Background
The remnant of the Champa Kingdom in a small enclave in Southeast part of Mainland Southeast Asia, Panduranga, known to the Vietnamese as Principality of Thuận Thành, had been annexed by the Vietnamese from the Nguyen lord's domain in 1692, who vassalized it instead of incorporating. During the Tayson rebellion (1771-1789) as the Nguyen were overthrown, Panduranga king Po Tisuntiraidapuran switched alliance to the Tayson rebels. By 1793, Panduranga effectively became a vassal client state of the Nguyen, who later conquered all of Vietnam in 1802. The first Nguyen emperor, Gia Long, tried to keep Panduranga as a vassal state. His successor, Minh Mang, an absolutist, wanted to annex and assimilate the last Cham entity. However, he met challenges from the Viceroyalties of Saigon and Hanoi, and increasing Cham resistance.

Islam began proliferating in Champa from the 11th century, growing more popular after the 1471 Vietnamese conquest of Champa. It replaced or blended with traditional Hindu-Chamic customs. The majority of Cham Muslims in Central Vietnam, including the royal family, were followers of Bani or localized Cham Shiites and still keep practicing Hindu-Chamic traditions, while on the other hand, the Cham Muslims in the Mekong Delta and Cambodia were majority Sunni. The dynamic omnipresence of the Cham people and their diaspora communities scattered throughout Southeast Asia remains a great challenge posing to every ruler of Vietnam as well as Cambodia.

In August 1832, after the death of his foremost enemy, Viceroy of Saigon–Le Van Duyet, Minh Mang of Vietnam triumphantly annexed Panduranga and held the last Cham king Po Phaok The as royal hostage in Hue court. Minh Mang forced the Chams to integrate, as well as purging dissents and supporters of Le Van Duyet. A Khâm Mạng (generalized as "temporary assigned") official was sent to Panduranga as the new magistrate and to punish the Chams who were suspected to be supporters of Duyet.

Several Cham officials were jailed, sent to exile, or executed, and their properties were confiscated. Shortly after the purge, the Khâm Mạng office ordered the Cham to abandon their culture and practice Vietnamese customs. They forbid the Cham Bani and Sunnis to exercise Ramadhan month and Cham Hindus to worship their ancestors, completely removing the traditional Cham social hierarchy. The Vietnamese office further ordered total rapid assimilation of the Chams, integrating Panduranga into Vietnamese administration, heavy taxes, social structures, land, military services were implemented, and issued brutal punishments for those who dare to oppose. Still, these policies were just to increase Cham dissatisfaction and resistance to Vietnamese brutal subjugation.

Katip Sumat, a Cambodian Cham khaṭīb that had been studied Islam in Kelantan, Malay Peninsula, was outraged hearing the news that Champa was annexed by the Hue court in 1832 and Vietnamese oppressive rules over the old Panduranga. Cham sources did not assert a specific biography for Sumat whether was he actually a cleric or a religious student. He left Kelantan and returned to Cambodia in early 1833, which at the time was in a state of anarchy and being occupied by Vietnam. Sumat assembled his follower bands, mostly made up of Cambodian Chams and Malays secretly crossed into Panduranga, at first, to organize an uprising against the Hue court and reclaim Cham independence. However his plan was compromised shortly after when a Cham Hindu official named Po Kabait Thuac, because of fearing retaliation, reported Sumat's potential uprising to the Vietnamese court. In response, Minh Mang immediately asked all alleged Cham supporters of katip Sumat to be arrested, but it turned out to be poor intelligence gathering of the Hue court, in which later all suspects were released and Thuac was executed by the Vietnamese court for "making false accusation."

Nevertheless, Sumat was frustrating and distrusted "some of Cham gentlemen are betraying him," and he intended to give up the movement in reluctance. But his supporters tried to convince him to continue taking lead in the uprising. Finally, the katip agreed to renew the movement, but took a more radical Islamist path over the original national liberation goal, under Islamic banner.

To prepare for the uprising, katip Sumat gathered his followers on a cinder-core mount called Aih Amrak in Đồng Nai province as his sang masjid operational base, preaching the Qur'an and disseminating Islamism, coalescing Muslims from various backgrounds. Then, Sumat sent his followers to the Central Highlands to teach Islam among Churu and Jarai villagers and recruiting more fighters, demanded his followers "absolute loyalty to Allah and Islam." His forces also murdered and kidnapped Cham Bani leaders who spoke against his radical propagation of Islam.

Revolt in Southern Vietnam
Having refused all of Minh Mang's requests to surrender, in summer or unknown month of 1833, Katip Sumat and his forces began a general uprising in a large area in Southern Vietnam, from Ninh Thuan to Dong Nai: Tuan Lik in Phan Rí, Kuac Riwa in Long Hương (Bà Rịa), and Ja Thak Wa in Phan Rang, all raised flags with two Cham words Po Rasak (figuratively: His Great Glorious Wonderful, an implication for either Allāh and prophet Mohammed) enlarged on them. The uprising arose in many towns, attacking Vietnamese tax register centers and military garrisons. Sumat's main goals were first to liberate Champa from Vietnamese rule, then spread Islam further in the Indochina peninsula, seek to establish an Islamic Vietnam by using "militant Islamism" (Jihadism) ideology, which at the time was relatively new in the Southeast Asia context.

Minh Mang's instant response was sending 1,000 well-equipped royal troops to suppress the rebellion, along with mobilizing Kinh civilians in Binh Thuan into militia units to join with government forces. Caught between the Hue court and the Islamist revolt, Cham civilians became targets of Vietnamese atrocities. Vietnamese troops unleashed havoc on the areas, burning Cham villages to the ground (particularly coastal villages to prevent civilians to flee overseas) and massacred innocent civilians in great numbers. Vietnamese Kinh militia-civilians and marauding bands, took advantage of the chaotic moment, murdering Cham civilians on their own to "redeem" personal and ethnic hostility, seizing and burning Cham farmlands.

The death toll and scale of destruction were horrific, the area and most of its villages and towns were greatly devastated. Minh Mang at the same time was imposing an isolationist closed-door policy, blocking people from getting out, restricting foreign trade and missionaries. The outside world was completely unaware of the bloodbath that occurring in former Champa. Believing that Po Ouwalah Allāh will always bless and safeguard them for victory, the katip and his forces were unprepared for the court's paranoid retaliation and terrors that unleashed, and retreated to the highlands in the west, but still ordered revolts in lowland to keep fighting against government's soldiers.

In such circumstances, Minh Mang then sought to ease his assimilation progress of the Cham, switching to condemn the rapid spreading of Islam and militant Islamism in Southern Vietnam. His agenda became "preventing Islamic extremism" instead of previously "assimilating the Chams", seeking sorts of divisions and sectarian disputes among the Cham, which provided him supports from moderate Cham Bani and Cham Hindus, thus weakening the Islamic movement's position.

Among the leadership of the Katip Sumat uprising, fragile began growing. A leader of the movement, awal Ja Thak Wa–a moderate Cham Shi'a Bani cleric–protested against the radical zealot faction of katip Sumat. Cham documents assert that disputes between Ja Thak Wa and Sumat were related to critics of Sumat's snatching of the national liberation movement and turned it into his own campaign to spread Islam and establish an Islamic state in Vietnam while Ja Thak Wa's goals were to reestablish the Cham state along with Hindu-Bani traditions. Sumat turned against and maneuvered to expel Ja Thak Wa out of the movement by appealing the Hue court to arrest Ja Thak Wa. Sumat also attacked other leaders of the movement in a power struggle. Ja Thak Wa soon later decided to split from Sumat and formed his resistance front focusing on Cham emancipation from Vietnamese rules, and his movement rallied all peoples regardless of religion and ethnicity to revolt against the Vietnamese court. The rebellion of Ja Thak Wa was considered more popular and dangerous to the Hue court. Lacking unity and popular support, by late 1833 or early 1834, the Katip Sumat uprising either had been dissipated by itself or crushed by government forces, and Sumat himself disappeared from the scene.

References

Works cited

See also 
 Islam in Vietnam
 Ja Lidong rebellion
 Nduai Kabait rebellion
 Lê Văn Khôi revolt
 Ja Thak Wa uprising
 History of the Cham–Vietnamese wars

19th century in Vietnam
Military history of Vietnam
Rebellions in the Nguyễn dynasty
Rebellions in Asia
1833 in Vietnam
1834 in Vietnam
Conflicts in 1833
Conflicts in 1834
19th-century rebellions
Jihad
History of Champa
National liberation movements
History of Ninh Thuận Province
Violence against indigenous peoples